The Secretary of State for Press, also known as Secretary of State for Communication (SECOM) is a high-ranking official of the Office of the Spanish Prime Minister in charge of the government's communication policy. This position must not to be confused with the Spokesperson of the Government, which is normally one of the government ministers.

Unlike what happens in other countries, the Secretary of State is not responsible for appearing before the media, but is responsible for collecting national and international information and advises the Prime Minister on how to use it or disseminate it. It is also responsible for coordinating the rest of the Administration's press departments, both inside and outside.

It depends functionally on the Spokesperson, who is usually a minister or an official with the rank of minister who is in charge of appearing before the media. The current position was created in 1996, however, the history of the press department dates back to 1910s.

Functions
The Secretary of State is in charge of:
 The coordination of the information policy of the central government and the elaboration of the criteria for its determination, as well as the promotion and coordination of the institutional communication policy of the State.
 The elaboration and diffusion of the communiqués of the Government and its Prime Minister and the review of the activities of the Council of Ministers.
 The direction of the information services of the General State Administration in Spain and abroad.
 Relations with the media, as well as the analysis of the national and international conjuncture.
 The organization of the national and international coverage of governmental activity.
 Attendance at the activities and public appearances of the Prime Minister, both in national territory and abroad.
 The support to the Commission of publicity and institutional communication, in the exercise of the functions that attributes the Royal Decree 947/2006, of 28 of August, by which regulates the Commission of publicity and institutional communication and the elaboration of the Advertising and Communication Annual Plan of the General State Administration.
 The management of communication in situations of national emergencies.
 The analysis of current legislation on information and the proposal of measures for improvement.

Structure 
From the Secretary of State depends:
 The Department for National Information.
 The National Information Unit.
 The Economic Information Unit.
 The Department for International Information.
 The Deputy Directorate-General for International Information.
The Department for Regional Information.
The Deputy Directorate-General for Regional Information.
The Digital Department.
The Digital Information Unit.
 The Deputy Director General of Analysis and Documentation.
 The Information Logistics Unit.
 The Institutional Advertising Unit.

The press departments of the embassies of Spain and all the diplomatic missions depend from the Secretary of State.

List of secretaries of state
 Manuel Ortiz Sánchez (1978–1979)
 Josep Meliá Pericás (1979–1980)
 Rosa Posada Chapado (1980–1981)
 Ignacio Aguirre Borrell (1981–1982)
 Eduardo Sotillos Palet (1982–1985)
 Santiago Varela Díaz (1985–1988)
 Miguel Gil Peral (1993–1996)
 Miguel Ángel Rodrígez Bajón (1996–1998)
 Pedro Antonio Martín Marín (1998–2000)
 Alfredo Timermans del Olmo (2002–2004)
 Miguel Barroso Ayats (2004–2005)
 Fernando Moraleda Quílez (2005–2008)
 Nieves Goicoechea (2008–2010)
 Félix Monteira de la Fuente (2010–2011)
 Carmen Martínez Castro (2011–2018)
 Miguel Ángel Oliver (2018–2021)
Francesc Vallès Vives (2021–present)

References

Politics of Spain
Spanish Prime Minister's Office
Secretaries of State of Spain